Hernandia nukuhivensis is a species of plant in the Hernandiaceae family. It is endemic to French Polynesia.

References

Flora of French Polynesia
Hernandiaceae
Least concern plants
Taxonomy articles created by Polbot